David Alfred Andrade (30 April 1859 – 23 May 1928) was an Australian individualist and free market anarchist.

Biography
His parents were Abraham Da Costa Andrade and Maria Giles, both from Middlesex, England. His brother William Charles Andrade was an anarchist too. They were active in Joseph Symes's Australasian Secular Association.

In 14 May 1886, David Andrade, his brother Will and half a dozen others formed the Melbourne Anarchist Club (MAC), the first anarchist organisation in Australia. Andrade became the MAC secretary and one of its main propagandists.

The MAC produced the journal Honesty, an Australian organ of anarchism which had substantially the same principles as those championed by Benjamin Tucker's Liberty. In a news agency at Brunswick, now an inner suburb of Melbourne, and later in Liberty Hall, Russell St. Melbourne the brothers operated the first anarchist book shops in Australia. Andrade was a vegetarian and with his brother operated the first vegetarian restaurant in Melbourne.

Andrade's main works include Money: A Study of the Currency Question (1887), Our Social System (n.d.), An Anarchist Plan of Campaign (1888), and The Melbourne Riots and how Harry Holdfast and his Friends Emancipated the Workers (1892).

In the early 1890s, Andrade was the secretary of the Unemployed Workers Association. He died in hospital in 1928.

Selected publications
Essay on Truth (1880)
Money: A Study of the Currency Question (1887)
An Anarchist Plan of Campaign (1888)
Our Social System (1890) 
The Melbourne Riots and How Harry Holdfast and his Friends Emancipated the Workers (1892)

References

Further reading
 Andrade, David Alfred (1859–1928) Australian Dictionary of Biography. Accessed 1 May 2007
 Melbourne's Radical Bookshops by John Sendy, (1983) International Bookshop Pty Ltd
 A Reader of Australian Anarchism 1886–1896 by Bob James (1979) No ISBN
 Anarchy by David Andrade in Honesty, Melbourne, February 1889, published in Anarchism in Australia: An Anthology 1886–1986 edited by Bob James, Melbourne (1986) No ISBN

1859 births
1928 deaths
Anarchist writers
Australian anarchists
Australian anti-capitalists
Australian male non-fiction writers
Australian political philosophers
Australian political writers
Australian vegetarianism activists
Free-market anarchists
Individualist anarchists
Libertarian socialists
People from Collingwood, Victoria